{{DISPLAYTITLE:C26H32F2O7}}
The molecular formula C26H32F2O7 (molar mass: 494.52 g/mol, exact mass: 494.21161) may refer to:
 Diflorasone diacetate
 Fluocinonide

Molecular formulas